Virginia Mariani Campolieti (born 4 December 1869, d. 1941) was an Italian pianist, orchestra conductor and composer. She was born in Genoa, Italy, and studied piano at the Liceo Musicale Rossini in Pesaro with Mario Vitale and Luigi Torchi, graduating in 1892. She conducted some of her opera performances. She composed Dal sogno alla vita, opera.

Works
Campolieti composed vocal music and one opera. Selected works include:
33 Canzoncine per Bambini, Vol. 3
Apotheosis di Rossini, cantata for solo soprano, chorus, organ and orchestra

References

Italian women classical composers
Italian women pianists
1869 births
1941 deaths
Italian classical composers
Musicians from Genoa
20th-century classical composers
20th-century Italian composers
20th-century Italian women
20th-century Italian conductors (music)
Women classical pianists
20th-century women composers
20th-century women pianists